Ottawa County is a county located in the northeastern corner of the U.S. state of Oklahoma. As of the 2020 census, the population was 30,285. Its county seat is Miami. The county was named for the Ottawa Tribe of Oklahoma. It is also the location of the federally recognized Modoc Nation and the Quapaw Nation, which is based in Quapaw.

Ottawa County comprises the Miami, OK Micropolitan Statistical Area, which is included in the Joplin-Miami, MO-OK Combined Statistical Area. The county borders both Kansas and Missouri.

The county was an important lead and zinc mining region during the early 1900s, and in 1983 the Tar Creek Superfund site was inaugurated to clean up tailings and prevent groundwater and waterway contamination with leachates.

History
Archaeological studies indicate this area was inhabited for thousands of years by succeeding cultures of prehistoric indigenous peoples. According to the Encyclopedia of Oklahoma History & Culture, at the start of the 20th century, there were eight known Archaic sites (6000 B. C. to 1 A. D.), sixteen Woodland sites (1 A. D. to 1000 A.D.), and six Plains Village sites (1000 to 1500 A. D.).

The Osage Nation had moved into the area from Missouri and Kansas by the 19th century, under pressure from European-American encroachment on their lands. They ceded this land to the Federal Government in exchange for another area farther west in Indian Territory. In 1828, the Western Cherokee, the first group of this nation to relocate west of the Mississippi River, ceded their land in Western Arkansas to the Federal Government in exchange for some of the land just vacated by the Osage.

In 1831, the Federal Government reacquired part of what would eventually become Ottawa County in order to resettle some smaller tribes that had been forced west from the Midwest under its Indian Removal program. These included two tribes of Iroquois, Shawnee, Quapaw, Peoria, Kaskaskia, Miami, Ottawa and Wyandotte. The Neosho Agency administered the affairs of these tribes from 1837 until 1871. In that year, it was renamed as the Quapaw Agency, serving only the tribes in Indian Territory.

The Modoc band led by Captain Jack in northern California was exiled and relocated here in 1873, after being taken as prisoner following their defeat in the Modoc War. The 153 members were settled at the Quapaw Agency. After regaining federally recognized status in 1978 as the Modoc Tribe of Oklahoma, they were given land of their own under federal trust in this county. Native Americans make up nearly 17% of the population in the county.

This county is part of the Tri-state District, a center of lead and zinc mining through the first half of the 20th century. Unrestricted mining resulted in severe environmental degradation and mining centers such as Picher, Oklahoma in the county were included within the Tar Creek Superfund Site in 1980. Environmental remediation has been conducted, but the state and federal government have also closed Picher as a city and relocated nearly all its residents since the early 21st century. In 1996 the government found that 34% of the children of Picher, OK had lead poisoning due to groundwater, air and dust effects.

Geography
It is the fourth-smallest county in Oklahoma by area. The eastern part of the county lies in the Ozark Plains, while the western is in the Neosho Lowlands.

Adjacent counties
 Cherokee County, Kansas (north)
 Newton County, Missouri (east)
 McDonald County, Missouri (southeast)
 Delaware County (south)
 Craig County (west)

Demographics

As of the census of 2020, there were 33,194 people, 12,984 households, and 9,114 families residing in the county.  The population density was 175/km2 (67.6/mi2).  There were 14,842 housing units at an average density of 12/km2 (32/mi2).  The racial makeup of the county was 68.9% White, 1.2% Black or African American, 20.3% Native American, 0.7% Asian, 0.9% Pacific Islander, 1.54% from other races, and 8.0% from two or more races.  5.9% of the population were Hispanic or Latino of any race.

There were 14,100 households, out of which 30.90% had children under the age of 18 living with them, 55.60% were married couples living together, 10.70% had a female householder with no husband present, and 29.80% were non-families. 26.60% of all households were made up of individuals, and 13.60% had someone living alone who was 65 years of age or older.  The average household size was 2.48 and the average family size was 2.98.

In the county, the population was spread out, with 25.70% under the age of 18, 9.70% from 18 to 24, 24.80% from 25 to 44, 22.90% from 45 to 64, and 16.90% who were 65 years of age or older.  The median age was 37 years. For every 100 females, there were 94.30 males.  For every 100 females age 18 and over, there were 90.10 males.

The median income for a household in the county was $27,507, and the median income for a family was $32,368. Males had a median income of $25,725 versus $18,879 for females. The per capita income for the county was $14,478.  About 13.00% of families and 16.60% of the population were below the poverty line, including 23.80% of those under age 18 and 12.20% of those age 65 or over.

Politics

Prior to 2008, Ottawa County was a swing county in presidential elections, backing the national winner in all but three presidential elections from 1912 to 2004. It has since become a Republican stronghold similar to the rest of the state, with Donald Trump's 2020 51.2 point win over Joe Biden being the most lopsided margin of victory in the county's electoral history.

Economy

Mining economy 
Lead and zinc mining has been important to the county economy since 1890, and Quapaw lands have been exploited for mining, first by lease. They were restricted in terms of receiving royalties and were generally excluded by discrimination from mining jobs. By 1910, the local mining industry was controlled by a few large corporations, including Commerce Mining and Royalty Company, the Eagle-Picher Company, the Childers Mining Company, the LaClede Lead and Zinc Company, and the American Lead and Zinc Company. 

In 1926, at the region's peak of production, Ottawa County was the largest source of lead and zinc in the world. By the 1960s most of the mines had closed, leaving mine shafts, sinkholes, chat piles, and other dangers for future cleanup.  Such areas have been designated as part of the Tar Creek Superfund Site by the US Environmental Protection Agency. Tripoli, primarily used as an abrasive, was found near Peoria in 1912, and was mined into the twenty-first century.

Contemporary tourism 
Today, Ottawa County, together with nearby Delaware County to the south, have a large impact on tourism in Oklahoma.  Said counties combined are the third-largest tourism destination in the state, following only the Oklahoma City and Tulsa metropolitan areas.

Communities

Cities
 Commerce
 Miami (county seat)

Towns
 Afton
 Fairland
 North Miami
 Peoria
 Quapaw
 Wyandotte

Census-designated places
 Dotyville
 Narcissa

Unincorporated communities
 Ottawa

Ghost towns
 Cardin
 Douthat
 Hockerville
 Picher
 Zincville

Education
School districts include:
 Afton Public Schools
 Commerce Public Schools
 Fairland Public Schools
 Miami Public Schools
 Quapaw Public Schools
 Welch Public Schools
 Wyandotte Public Schools
 Turkey Ford Public School (elementary only)

Picher-Cardin Public Schools was in operation until 2009.

NRHP sites

The following sites are in Ottawa County are listed on the National Register of Historic Places:

 Cities Service Station, Afton
 Coleman Theatre, Miami
 George L. Coleman Sr. House, Miami
 Commerce Building/Hancock Building, Miami
 Horse Creek Bridge, Afton
 John Patrick McNaughton Barn, Quapaw
 Miami Marathon Oil Company Service Station, Miami
 Miami Original Nine-Foot Section of Route 66 Roadbed, Miami
 Modoc Mission Church and Cemetery, Miami
 Narcissa D-X Gas Station, Miami
 Ottawa County Courthouse, Miami
 Peoria Indian School, Miami
 Peoria Tribal Cemetery, Miami
 Riviera Courts--Motel, Miami
 Tri-State Zinc and Lead Ore Producers Association Office, Picher

See also
 Quapaw Indian Agency

References

External links
 
 Ottawa County Map
 Oklahoma Digital Maps: Digital Collections of Oklahoma and Indian Territory

 
1907 establishments in Oklahoma
Populated places established in 1907
Ozarks